The Lucky Devil is a 1925 American silent comedy-drama film, also known as Lucky Devil, directed by Frank Tuttle, and released by Paramount Pictures.

Plot
Randy Farman, who demonstrates camping outfits in a department store, wins a racing car in a raffle and sets out for the West. He runs out of gas, loses all his money, and falls in love with a girl called Doris, who, accompanied by her aunt, is on her way to Nampa City to claim an inheritance.

Arriving at their destination, Doris and her aunt discover that the uncle, who sent for them, is locked up in an asylum, having invented the entire story of the bequest. Randy enters an exhibition fight with the champion boxer and stays long enough to win the entrance fee for an automobile race at the county fair. The sheriff has attached Randy's car for nonpayment of a hotel bill, and Randy must drive the entire race with the sheriff in the seat beside him. Randy wins the race, a substantial prize, and Doris' love.

Cast

Preservation status
This film is preserved at the Library of Congress, George Eastman House, the UCLA Film and Television Archive, and the Pacific Film Archive at the University of California, Berkeley.

References

External links 

The Lucky Devil at TCM Database
Review at silentsaregolden.com
Stills and review at moviessilently.com

1925 films
American auto racing films
American silent feature films
Films directed by Frank Tuttle
Films shot in New Jersey
Motorsports in fiction
Paramount Pictures films
Films based on short fiction
American black-and-white films
1925 comedy-drama films
1920s English-language films
1920s American films
Silent American comedy-drama films